"Touchdown" is a song by the West Coast rapper The Game from his third album LAX.  The song features the R&B singer Raheem DeVaughn.

Composition

The song contains a samples of "Right on for the Darkness" by the R&B/funk/soul singer Curtis Mayfield from his 1973 album Back to the World. The song contains a heavy bass line.

Critical reception
The song gathered generally positive reviews from critics. Allmusic writer David Jeffries complimented The Game on his lyrics stating that "when the rapper refers to his woman as "beautiful as an Eli Manning pass," it's just one of the reasons the feel-good "Touchdown" is a highlight."

Chart performance
"Touchdown" debuted at #57 on the Hot R&B/Hip-Hop Songs chart based on digital sales alone, even though it was never released as an official single.

References

2008 songs
The Game (rapper) songs
Raheem DeVaughn songs
Songs written by Curtis Mayfield
Songs written by The Game (rapper)